Josée Nadeau is a Canadian artist (painter) and producer who gained a reputation internationally after spending 10 years in Claude Monet's Garden as protégée of its curator .

At The invitation of The Curator of Claude Monet's Garden Gerald Van der Kemp and his wife Florence, Nadeau returned each year to paint in The Gardens and use the premises as to her liking for inspiration while living on the grounds in the private studio of its curator from 1998 to 2008.

Nadeau use of colors and simplicity of subject matters is what captured the attention of Gerald Van der Kemp and his wife Florence who in return introduced her to high society of Europe. After Gerald's passing in 2001, Florence invited Nadeau at The head table at The Ball of Versailles and introduced her as the preferred artist of her late husband saying that she was most talented. In 2006 Hubert de Givenchy who received Nadeau at his private home in Paris while having tea just the two of them in his study stated how refreshing Nadeau's work is. That same year in New York, Florence invited Nadeau to her annual luncheon at The Colony where she assigned the artist beside The fame retired Art Critic John Russell (London Times, New York Times) who then invited to see her work and branded it Sensual by its purity of its brush stroke and movement. From 2010 to 2015 Nadeau was the artist in residence and guest artist at The World Equestrian Festival in Wellington, Florida. There she painted some of the finest horses in the world including Georgina Bloomberg "Diplomacy".  In 2012 Nadeau was invited by the Ralph Lauren head of displays to show her work in Both South and East Hampton with her equine series.

While music came into play while meeting George Harrison from the Beatles who sang to Josée one on one for 4 hours at The private home of Guy Laliberté the founder of Cirque du Soleil, from the encounter Nadeau found inspiration to paint to music live in front of an audience. Nadeau first performance in New York was on Broadway on April 19, 2005, painting live to Tom Finn The Dj from Studio 54 at April in Paris Gala to raise funds for The Charitable cause Dress for Success. She then produced a live performance in 2012 painting on stage in front of an audience to a 95 piece symphony orchestra The Salt Lake Symphony, 2 paintings 8 feet x 8 feet in 20 minutes each. That same year, she was the guest of legendary Dionne Warwick 50th yr. anniversary celebration of professional life concert in Miami where she painted sharing the stage creating a large painting of Dionne to the song Do you know the way to San Jose in front of 1000 people. In 2013, Nadeau  painted in front of the United Nation and South African delegates Nelson Mandela in New York at The River Side Church a production of Footsteps of Mandela to celebrated Mandela's birthday the same yr after his passing.Nadeau painted to The Opera Signer Simon Estes The event raised money for The United Nations and Simon Estes Foundation's.

Nadeau resides and paints from her studios both in Florida and the south of France.

References

https://www.parkrecord.com/entertainment/waterkeeper-alliance-recruits-jose-nadeau-to-paint-during-fundraiser-and-gala/
https://www.parkrecord.com/entertainment/local-artist-creates-international-friendships/
https://www.parkrecord.com/entertainment/nadeau-will-paint-at-local-fundraiser/
https://www.parkrecord.com/entertainment/artist-josee-nadeau-riding-the-wave-of-creativity/

21st-century Canadian artists
Canadian women artists
Canadian painters